Like the Egyptians, Phoenicians and Carthaginians, the Etruscans were rather slow to adopt the invention of coinage. The brief period of Etruscan coinage, with the predominance of marks of value, seems to be an amalgam that reconciles two very different monetary systems: the 'primitive' bronze-weighing and aes grave economy of central Italy with that of struck silver and gold issues of southern Italian Greek type not familiar in Etruria.

Silver and gold

Setting aside the early 5th century BC Auriol-type silver fractions of the Volterra hoard of 1868, which are probably not of Etruscan production, the earliest struck silver coinage seems to be that of Vulci and Populonia. An attribution to the 5th century for these first issues of tridrachms, didrachms, or staters and drachms is plausible since they seem to be struck on the 'Chalcidian' silver drachm standard of theoretically about 5.8 grams, which were present at Etruria's nearest Greek neighbour, i.e. Cumae, dated to about 475-470 BC  and at other Greek cities important to Etruscan sea-borne commerce in the early 5th century, such as Himera, Naxos and Zancle. The coins are of Greek style, but with an Etruscan flavour and have a predilection for 'apotropaic' images of exotic animals and monsters that drive away evil demons. The wheels with curved struts of Vulci are also reminiscent of some 5th century Macedonian tribal coins. These early issues are rare and seem not to have been exported; they have no mark of value and must have had a limited circulation.

An issue of silver didrachms with a crudely engraved male head issued on a similar 'Chalcidian' weight standard to the undenominated coins of Vulci and Populonia, but bearing the mark of value 5, has been tentatively attributed to Luca during the last quarter of the 4th century or later. They correspond to a single silver unit of about 2.25 grams, probably representing the silver equivalent of a bronze as or libra, derived from the Greek litra. These male heads were probably followed by a more finely produced octopus/amphora silver series, also struck on the 'Chalcidian' standard, but with exactly double the unit of value of the former. The marks of value 20, 10 and 5, give a silver unit or as of about 1.13 grams, approximately one Roman scruple, and probably represent a devaluation of the bronze unit in relation to silver.

Populonia may have been the first Etruscan city to place a mark of value on its coinage, following a practice already established by the mid-5th century at Syracuse and other Sicilian mints for silver uncial fractions of the litra, and at Akragas, the silver 5-litrae denominated ΠΕΝ for pentalitron  and I for litra. The first Metus series has been dated to the second half of the 5th century by recent excavations at Prestino, via Isonzo, a chronology confirmed by the subsequent find of a rare 5-unit piece of the same series in the excavation of the early 4th century Etruscan sanctuary at Golasecca, from the phase III A 2 stratum. The weight standard employed seems to be the Corinthian stater (or Attic didrachm) with a theoretical weight of about 8.6 grams, subdivided into 10, 5 and 2 units that seem to be on the Sicilian silver litrae standard of 0.86 grams. An issue of staters on the 'Corinthian' standard attested at Cumae, Etruria's nearest Greek neighbour, dated to about 470-455 BC, may have provided the metrological model for this issue, which was denominated with Etruscan numeral X (=10); associated fractions are, V (= 5) and II< (=2).

The second Metus silver series of Populonia, massive by Etruscan standards, with the mark of value 20, 10 and 5 units, is on the same metrological standard as the Hercle and Menvra 20-units, male and female head 10, and male head 5, 2 and 1 unit and by metrological association, are related to the Metus, lion head, male and female headed 50 to 10 unit gold issues. Find evidence from the Ponte Gini di Orentino excavation  suggests a dating for this whole phase in the first half of the 3rd century and may be connected with the First Punic War. The metrology of this phase, with marks of value exactly double those of the first Metus issue, may correspond to the elusive 'Italian school' introduction of the denarius proposed by Pliny to 269 BC, as it is exactly on the same standard and anticipates the Roman denarius and multiple-as systems introduced during the Second Punic War in about 212/211.

An issue depicting a hippocamp with marks of value CC and C, tentatively attributed to Lucca, is on the same weight standard as the Populonia's second Metus series (20, 10 and 5 units), but the 10 units is expressed by two numerals of five (CC).

Last, but by no means least, is a spectacular gold series of high artistic merit probably from Volsini, with marks of value 20 and 5. The unique Apollo-like head/majestic bull walking 20-unit piece is reminiscent of the bronze issues of the Latin colonies of Aesernia, Cales, Compultaria, Suessa Aurunca and Teanum in Campania  dated to the mid-3rd century BC. The reverse running dog 5-unit coin is reminiscent of the Chiana Valley male head/dog running struck bronze of uncertain date in the 3rd century. This is an isolated series with a gold unit of approximately 0.225 grams, which places it before the main gold issue of Populonia with a gold unit of 0.056 grams issued in the earlier part of the 3rd century, and possibly related to the intervention of Rome at the time of the slave rebellion at Volsini in 265/4.

Bronze

The origin of Etruscan bronze coinage is to be sought in the central Italian pre-coinage aes rude ingots, or lumps and ramo secco and plain bronze bars, which circulated as currency throughout Italy from at least the 5th century BC. By circa 280 BC, the Roman libra or pound weighed about 325 g, subdivided into 12 unciae of about 27 g and 288 scripula of about 1,13 g. The cast round aes grave coinage of Volterra, Tarquinia, including bars, and the Chiana Valley with its associated struck unciae and semi-unciae, are all firmly dated to the 3rd century BC, including a series of oval shaped cast bronze possibly from Volsini. This cast coinage seems to mirror the extensive Roman series. The date of the inception of cast bronze coins is estimated to be about 280 BC and to have been progressively reduced in weight from libral to semi-libral at the outbreak of the Second Punic War in about 217 BC. Further reductions took place until the cast bronze gave way to struck sextantal bronze in about 214-212 BC, and the introduction of the silver 10-as denarius with its fractions, the quinarius (5-asses) and sestertius (2-asses).

Two large struck bronze series with Populonia and Vetulonia are close to the Roman post-semi-libral as standard that is dated by Crawford  to about 215-211 BC, but may be earlier in date. The Etruscans were not frightened to experiment, as is illustrated by the case of an extraordinary struck bronze series with incuse reverses, presumably from Populonia and based on a hundred units (or centesimal system) which may correspond to the struck Roman sexantal as, theoretically of about 54 grams. An even more remarkable issue from a metrological point of view is one that I interpret as a dual-denominated decimal/uncial series, overstruck on earlier post semi-libral bronzes, while a similar, but slightly lighter issue seems tariffed /X or 11 centismae, both dateable to about 200 BC.

References

Literature 
 AA. VV.: Convegni del Centro Internazionale di Studi Numismatici di Napoli: "Contributi introduttivi allo studio della monetazione etrusca. Atti del V Convegno, Napoli 1975", Istituto italiano di numismatica, Roma, 1977
 
 Alberto Campana: CNIA (Corpus Nummorum Italiæ Antiquæ) published in review Panorama Numismatico
 
 Keith N. Rutter. Greek coinages of Southern Italy and Sicily. London, Spink, 1997. 
 
 
 
 Sara Sorda: I ripostigli di bronzo protostorici dell'Italia centrale, in AA.VV.: "Atti del V convegno".
 Thompson M., Mørkholm O., Kray C. M. (eds.): An Inventory of Greek Coins Hoards (IGCH), New York, 1973
 Italo Vecchi: Etruscan Coinage. Part 1. A corpus of the coinage of the Rasna, together with an historical and economic commentary on the issues (gold, silver and bronze) from the mints of Cosa, Luca (?), Pisae (?), Populonia, Uncertain Central Italy, Vetulonia, Volsinii (?), Vulci (?) and unidentified mints, from 5th to 3rd centuries BC; Milano 2012, 
 Italo Vecchi, Italian Cast Coinage. A descriptive catalogue of the cast coinage of Rome and Italy. London LAC 2013. Hard bound in quarto format, 84 pages, 92 plates.

More texts 
 James Millingen: Considérations sur la Numismatique de l'ancienne Italie. Firenze, 1841, (supplementi nel 1844).
 Francesco Carelli: Numorum Italiae veteris Tabulae CCII, ed. Cavedoni, 1850. 
 Luigi Sambon: Recherches sur les monnaies de la presquíle italique depuis leur origine jusqu' a la bataille d'Actium. Napoli, 1870.
 Wilhelm Deecke: Etruskische Forschungen, Heft II. 1876.
 Raffaele Garrucci: Le monete dell'Italia antica. Monete fuse, monete coniate. Roma, 1885. (ne esiste una ristampa anastatica).
 Theodor Mommsen: Die Geschichte des römische Münzwesen - Berlin 1860. Tr. fr.: Histoire de la monnaie romain. Paris 1865. (Reprint Graz 1956. Reprint Forni 1990)
 Heinrich Dressel: Zeitschrift für Numismatik, xiv, 1887.
 Robert Seymour Conway, Italian Dialects. Cambridge, 1897.
 Ernst Justus Haeberlin, Die Systematik des ältesten römischen Münzwesens. Berlin, 1905.
 Ernst Justus Haeberlin, Die jüngste etruskische und die älteste römiche Goldprägung, Z. f. N., xxvi. 229 ff.
 Kurt Regling, Zum älteren römischen und italischen Münzwesen. Klio, Bd. vi, Heft 3, 1906.
 Italo Vecchi, Italian Cast Coinage. A descriptive catalogue of the cast coinage of Rome and Italy. London 2013. Hard bound in quarto format,72 pages, 87 plates.

Collections 
 Sylloge Nummorum Graecorum - American Numismatic Society

Coins
Etruscan artefacts
Etruscans